XHMTV-FM (100.9 MHz) is a radio station in Minatitlán, Veracruz, Mexico. It is known as El Lobo de Mina.

History
The concession for XEMTV-AM 1260 was awarded in 1983 to Jesús Adelaido Oscar Bravo Santos, reactivating the 1260 frequency vacated by XEDW-AM in 1969. The station was originally a daytimer broadcasting with 250 watts of power. It added the FM station in 1994.

In 2007, the station was transferred to Oscar Bravo, S.A. de C.V.

On November 17, 2021, Oscar Bravo, S.A. de C.V., surrendered the station's authority to operate on AM, becoming an FM-only station.

References

Radio stations in Veracruz
Radio stations established in 1983
1983 establishments in Mexico